Katie Von Schleicher is an American songwriter and musician based in Brooklyn, New York. She is the keyboardist and co-lead vocalist of Wilder Maker.

History 
In 2015, Von Schleicher signed with Ba Da Bing! Records to release her debut mini-album Bleaksploitation. The album was met with favorable reviews.

Von Schleicher is known for her dark pop songs, often recorded on four-track cassette.

Her debut full-length Shitty Hits was praised by Pitchfork, PopMatters, and Bandcamp. Paul Thompson described Shitty Hits as "a kaleidoscope in grayscale: creaky chamber-pop, dirge-driven doom-folk, hushed solo piano works."

Discography

References

Year of birth missing (living people)
Living people
American women songwriters
Songwriters from Maryland
American rock keyboardists
American women rock singers
21st-century American women